Joshua Helm (born April 3, 1982) is an American former professional basketball player. After graduating from Mercyhurst University, he starred in Iceland and the Netherlands, being named All-Star in both countries. In 2005 he was named the Úrvalsdeild Foreign Player of the Year in Iceland after leading the league in scoring with 37.2 points per game.

College career
Helm played college basketball for Mercyhurst University, alongside future Úrvalsdeild star Justin Shouse, where he was a three-time All Great Lakes Intercollegiate Athletic Conference (GLIAC) South Division selection. He was a second-team selection in 2001–02 and 2002–03 and a first-team selection in 2003–04. In 2017, he was inducted in to the school's Hall of Fame.

Professional career
Helm started his career with KFÍ in the Icelandic top-tier Úrvalsdeild karla. He was an instant hit with the team, and led the league in scoring, averaging 37.2 points per game. In January 2005, he was selected to the Icelandic All-Star game where he scored 13 points. In March, he became the tenth player in the Úrvalsdeild history to score 800 points in a single season. After the season he was named the Úrvalsdeild Foreign Player of the Year.

In June 2005, he signed with Rotterdam Basketbal of the Dutch Eredivisie. In February 2006, he was selected to the Dutch All-Star game.

During the 2006–2007 season, Helm played for Donar (then named Hanzevast Capitals for sponsorship reasons).

In 2007, Helm returned to the Úrvalsdeild karla and signed with reigning Icelandic champions KR. On October 7, he scored 25 points and grabbed 19 rebounds in KR's victory against ÍR in the Icelandic Super Cup. In January 2008, he was again selected to the Icelandic All-Star game, this time scoring 9 points. In the Úrvalsdeild, he was one of the best players in the league, averaging 20.8 points and 9.2 rebounds per game and helping KR finish with the second best record during the regular season. In the playoffs, KR unexpectedly lost in the first round to seventh seeded ÍR.

Titles, awards and achievements

Titles
Icelandic Super Cup: 2007

Awards
Úrvalsdeild Foreign Player of the Year: 2005
GLIAC South Division All First Team: 2004
GLIAC South Division All Second Team (2): 2002, 2003

Achievements
Úrvalsdeild karla scoring champion: 2005
Icelandic All-Star (2): 2005, 2008
Dutch All-Star: 2006
Mercyhurst University Hall of Fame: 2017

References

External links
Profile at Eurobasket.com
Dutch League statistics

1982 births
Living people
American expatriate basketball people in Iceland
American expatriate basketball people in the Netherlands
American men's basketball players
Donar (basketball club) players
Dutch Basketball League players
Feyenoord Basketball players
Forwards (basketball)
KR men's basketball players
Mercyhurst Lakers men's basketball players
Úrvalsdeild karla (basketball) players
Vestri men's basketball players